Lady Anne Katherine Babington, (26 March 1908 – 15 July 1964) generally known as Lady Anne Babington, was a member of the English aristocracy.

Life
Born Lady Anne Katherine Egerton on 26 March 1908 to John Egerton, 4th Earl of Ellesmere and Lady Violet Lambton.
Married Captain Geoffrey Babington of the 16th/5th Lancers on 8 April 1931, they had three children, Ciro Anne (1932), David Henry Anthony (1936) and Margaret Angel (1943).  In 1947 she gave her address as Ascrevie.
Babington died on 15 July 1964.

See also
 Babington family

References

Daughters of British earls
1908 births
1964 deaths